Brody  is a village in the administrative district of Gmina Oleśnica, within Staszów County, Świętokrzyskie Voivodeship, in south-central Poland.

The village has a population of  37.

Demography 
According to the 2002 Poland census, there were 35 people residing in Brody village, of whom 45.7% were male and 54.3% were female. In the village, the population was spread out, with 22.9% under the age of 18, 25.7% from 18 to 44, 17.1% from 45 to 64, and 34.3% who were 65 years of age or older.
 Figure 1. Population pyramid of village in 2002 – by age group and sex

References

Villages in Staszów County